Lebanon competed at the 1976 Winter Olympics in Innsbruck, Austria.

Alpine skiing

Women

References
Official Olympic Reports
 Olympic Winter Games 1976, full results by sports-reference.com

Nations at the 1976 Winter Olympics
1976 Winter Olympics
1976 in Lebanese sport